Vision Air can refer to one of several airlines

Vision Airlines of the United States
 Vision Air Ltd, the executive charter division of Western Air of the Bahamas